The Anderson Place Historic District, in Birmingham, Alabama, is a residential historic district which was listed on the National Register of Historic Places in 1986, and the listing was expanded in 1991.  The houses date from 1907 to 1912 and include Tudor Revival, Queen Anne, and Bungalow/Craftsman architecture.

The original area is roughly bounded by Fourteenth Ave. S, Eighteenth St. S, Sixteen Ave. S, and Fifteenth St. S.  It includes work by architect D.O. Whilldin and others.

The increase area is roughly bounded by 16th Ave. S. from 15th St. to a line S from 18th St.

References

Historic districts on the National Register of Historic Places in Alabama
National Register of Historic Places in Birmingham, Alabama
Queen Anne architecture in Alabama
Tudor Revival architecture in the United States
Colonial Revival architecture in Alabama